Circumostomy eczema frequently occurs after an ileostomy or colostomy in which there is eczematization or autosensitization of the surrounding skin.

See also
Skin lesion

References

Eczema